The John Clifton House is a historic house at 1803 Pecan Street in Texarkana, Arkansas.  It is a single-story brick structure, with a porch wrapping around the front facade, supported by large square brick piers.  It has a low-pitch roof with rafters exposed at the gabled side elevations, and horizontal ribbons of windows.  It is a fine local example of the Prairie School of architecture, and the best in the Pleasant Hill neighborhood.  The house was built in 1908 for John Dial Clifton and Frances Brewer Clifton, and was a well-known site of social gatherings.  Clifton, who worked for an importer, died of tuberculosis in 1934.

The house was listed on the National Register of Historic Places in 2000.

See also
National Register of Historic Places listings in Miller County, Arkansas

References

Houses on the National Register of Historic Places in Arkansas
Prairie School architecture in Arkansas
Houses completed in 1908
Houses in Miller County, Arkansas
National Register of Historic Places in Miller County, Arkansas
1908 establishments in Arkansas
Buildings and structures in Texarkana, Arkansas